Marcel Zimmermann (born 20 January 1985) is a retired German tennis player.

Zimmermann has a career high ATP singles ranking of 299 achieved on 11 April 2011. He also has a career high doubles ranking of 303 achieved on 7 June 2010. Zimmermann has won 1 ATP Challenger doubles title at the 2009 Oberstaufen Cup.

Tour titles

Doubles

External links
 
 

1985 births
Living people
German male tennis players
Tennis players from Munich
People from Emmerich am Rhein
Sportspeople from Düsseldorf (region)